Each Man Kills the Thing He Loves is the debut album from Gavin Friday following his exit from the Virgin Prunes.  It was released in 1989 and is also his first collaboration with Maurice "The Man" Seezer.

The title track is an excerpt from Oscar Wilde's The Ballad of Reading Gaol set to original music.  This album also features covers of Bob Dylan's "Death is not the End" and Jacques Brel's "Next" (in French : "Au Suivant").

Track listing
All tracks written and arranged by Gavin Friday and Maurice Seezer; except where indicated

 "Each Man Kills the Thing He Loves" (Lyrics by Oscar Wilde) - 5:31
 "Tell Tale Heart" - 4:41
 "Apologia" - 5:28
 "Dazzle and Delight" - 6:24
 "Next" - (Jacques Brel; English lyrics by Mort Shuman and Eric Blau) - 2:02
 "You take Away the Sun" - 3:32
 "Death is not the End" - (Bob Dylan) - 5:40
 "He Got What he Wanted" - 3:25
 "Man of Misfortune" - 4:40
 "Rags to Riches" - 3:35
 "The Next Thing to Murder" - 2:59
 "Love is Just a Word" - 3:41
 "Another Blow on the Bruise" - 3:24
 "Each Man Kills the Thing He Loves (Reprise)" - 3:07

Personnel
Fernando Saunders - bass, guitar
Hank Roberts - cello, electronics
Bill Frisell - guitar
Marc Ribot - guitar, banjo
Howard Kaylan, Mark Volman - backing vocals on "Man of Misfortune"
Michael Blair - drums, percussion

References

Gavin Friday albums
1989 debut albums
Albums produced by Hal Willner